Faithful is the title of Dusty Springfield's planned third album for Atlantic Records, and seventh and final recorded studio album overall, recorded in the first half of 1971. Two singles from the planned album, "I Believe In You" (b/w "Someone Who Cares"), and "Haunted" (b/w "Nothing Is Forever", a track not intended for the album) were released in the U.S. in the fall of 1971, but failed to chart nationally. Due to poor response from the two singles, and a rumoured falling out with Atlantic executives, Springfield's contract with the company was not renewed, and the planned album was shelved and never given a catalogue number or title.

Faithful was a working title, taken from the name of an album track, "I'll Be Faithful", which had possibly been under consideration as a third single. A fire in the mid-seventies at one of Atlantic's storage sites was thought to have destroyed the Faithful session tapes, leaving only the two singles (and possible third single, as a mono mix existed into the nineties) and their b-sides from the sessions intact. However, in the nineties the album's producer, Jeff Barry, was asked about the sessions and revealed he had kept completed stereo mixes of all the tracks. Most were released as bonus tracks on the Rhino/Atlantic deluxe remastered edition of Dusty in Memphis in 1999, though "Someone Who Cares" and "Nothing is Forever" had been released on Springfield's UK-only 1972 album See All Her Faces.

In April 2015, Faithful was released as a proper album, forty-four years after its planned release was shelved, with an additional bonus track,  "Nothing Is Forever", which was the B-side to the aforementioned single "Haunted". Additionally, Faithful marks Springfield's 14th and final studio album release, chronologically speaking, first in two decades, and first posthumous release. The release of the album as a standalone work, rather than a collection of bonus tracks, leaves only the planned 1974 release Longing as her lone remaining unreleased album.

Faithful received a limited-edition, orange-colored vinyl release in May 2016, restricted to 1000 copies. Due to technical limitations this reissue does not feature the bonus track, "Nothing Is Forever".

Track listing

"I'll Be Faithful" (Ned W. Albright, Michael F. Soles, Steven Soles) - 2:59
"Live Here With You" (Gilbert Slavin, Michael F. Soles) - 2:44 
"Haunted" (Jeff Barry, Bobby Bloom) - 2:24
"Someone Who Cares" (Alex Harvey) - 2:54
"Make It With You" (David Gates) - 3:13
"Love Shine Down" (Neil Brian Goldberg, Gilbert Slavin) - 2:21
"I Believe In You" (Jeff Barry) - 3:29
"Have A Good Life Baby" (Neil Goldberg) - 3:09
"Natchez Trace" (Neil Goldberg, Gilbert Slavin) - 2:57
"All The King's Horses" (Neil Goldberg, Dusty Springfield, Joseph Renzetti) - 3:09
"You've Got a Friend" (Carole King) - 5:27
"I Found My Way Through The Darkness" (Gilbert Slavin, Michael F. Soles) - 3:16
"Nothing Is Forever" (Jeff Barry, Bobby Bloom) - 2:34

References

 Howes, Paul (2001). The Complete Dusty Springfield. London: Reynolds & Hearn Ltd. .
 http://www.realgonemusic.com/news/2015/2/12/dusty-springfield.html

Dusty Springfield albums
2015 albums
Albums produced by Jeff Barry
Albums published posthumously